Simon Carves Engineering Ltd. is an engineering company headquartered in Manchester, England. It was founded in 1878 by Henry Simon and is a subsidiary of Mitsui Engineering & Shipbuilding.

History
Simon Carves was founded in 1878 by Henry Simon after he visited the Bessèges works at Terrenoire and saw the potential for the coke oven business in development by François Carvès. He secured the patent rights to this innovative technology and in due course established the company.

In 1890, Henry Simon left a note to his sons, who were to inherit control of the company, urging them to acquire a sound technical education and to keep in close touch with scientific development throughout the world. His desire for them to be in a continuous search for engineering specialities and patents which would be used to improve the efficiency of large scale industrial processes in Britain and elsewhere, has eked into the company mentality and remains a leading factor in Simon Carves Engineering's approach to business today.

In 2006, the business was purchased by Punj Lloyd. In 2016, it was sold to ECI Group, a subsidiary of Mitsui Engineering & Shipbuilding.

Overview
The Simon Carves brand has become synonymous with numerous technologies, including nuclear power, gasification, fertiliser, petroleum refining and petrochemicals, having delivered over 4,000 projects across six continents in 60 countries.

They are recognised as the world's leading specialist engineering contractor for low-density polyethylene (LDPE) and ethylene-vinyl acetate (EVA); responsible for the design of 25% of the current global operating capacity. To date they have designed and supplied for more than 65 plants for polymer manufacturing, including 80 streams in 40 plants for LDPE and EVA.

References

External links
Simon Engineering Group Archives 1860s–1970s
 Grace's Guide on Henry Simon, Henry Simon Ltd, Simon-Carves Ltd, Simon Engineering Ltd

Companies based in Manchester
Construction and civil engineering companies established in 1878
Engineering companies of the United Kingdom
Mitsui
Nuclear technology companies of the United Kingdom
1878 establishments in England